Pär Mårts (born 30 April 1953) is a Swedish former professional ice hockey player and coach of the Swedish National team.

Playing career
Mårts started his playing career in 1971 for playing VIK Västerås HK in Swedish third-tier division. The following season the club was promoted to Sweden's second-tier division HockeyAllsvenskan. In his fourth season 1974-75 he joined Stockholm based club AIK helping them win promotion for Elitserien. During the seasons of 1975–76 to 1979-80 he played 174 games in Elitserien, totalling 121 points (63 goals, 58 assists) and 63 penalty minutes. Mårts played his last five seasons of his active playing career for Västerås IK in HockeyAllsvenskan.

Coaching career
Mårts has functioned as ice hockey coach since 1986 and is currently head coach of HV71, which he has won one Swedish Championships with. He has coached Västerås IK, Swedish national junior team, Swedish national team, AIK and HV71.

For season 2007-08 Mårts took over as head coach for the Swedish national junior teams; Team 19 and Team 20. His contract with the Swedish Ice Hockey Association spans over three years.

In 2011 he took over the national team which beat favourite Czech team in Košice,Slovakia.

Awards
 Gold medal as assistant coach at the 1992 World Championships.
 Silver medal as assistant coach at the 1993 and 1995 World Championships.
 Bronze medal as assistant coach at the 1994 World Championships.
 Olympic gold as assistant coach in 1994.
 Elitserien playoff winner as head coach for HV71 in 2004.
 Swedish Coach of the Year in 2004.
 Silver medal as head coach at the 2008 and 2009 U20 World Championships.
 Bronze medal as head coach at the 2010 U20 World Championships.
 Elitserien silver medal as player in 1978.
 Silver medal as head coach at the 2011 World Championships.
 Gold medal as head coach at the 2013 World Championships.
 Silver medal as head coach at the 2014 Sochi Winter Games.
 Bronze medal as head coach at the 2014 World Championships.

Career statistics

Statistics as of 21 April 2006.

References

1953 births
Living people
Sweden men's national ice hockey team coaches
Swedish ice hockey forwards
Swedish ice hockey coaches
VIK Västerås HK players
People from Falun
Medalists at the 2014 Winter Olympics
Medalists at the 1994 Winter Olympics
Olympic gold medalists for Sweden
Olympic silver medalists for Sweden
Sportspeople from Dalarna County